Bo Rune Ingemar Ralph (born 4 October 1945) is a Swedish linguist, member of the Swedish Academy, and professor of Nordic Languages at the Department of Swedish Language at Gothenburg University. He was elected to the Swedish Academy on 15 April 1999 and admitted on 20 December 1999. Bo Ralph succeeded the philosopher and sociologist Torgny T:son Segerstedt to Seat No.2.

He is a member of the Norwegian Academy of Science and Letters.

Bibliography
 Introduktion i historisk språkvetenskap (1971)
 Riktlinjer för en systemlösning till Meijerbergs etymologiska register (1972)
 Contributions to case theory (1972)
 The development of final devoicing in the Germanic languages (1973)
 Constraining predictiveness in phonology (1974)
 Phonological differentiation : studies in Nordic language history (1975)
 Fornsvenska (1984)
 Svenskans grundläggande prepositioner (1984)
 Sicket mål (1986); co-author: Lars-Gunnar Andersson
 Mål på hemmaplan (1987); co-author: Lars-Gunnar Andersson
 Torgny Segerstedt : inträdestal i Svenska akademien (1999)

Notes

References

1945 births
Living people
People from Gothenburg
Members of the Swedish Academy
Linguists from Sweden
Academic staff of the University of Gothenburg
Members of the Norwegian Academy of Science and Letters